The Administration for Security and Counterintelligence, commonly referred to by the acronym UBK, was the domestic counterintelligence and security agency of North Macedonia. Its headquarters are located in Skopje, and the agency is under jurisdiction of the Ministry of Internal Affairs.

The agency was founded in the People's Republic of Macedonia under the name Department for People's Protection OZNA, as the official security agency in the Macedonian socialist republic. Officially, the Administration for Security and Counterintelligence, was founded in 1995 under the name Directorate for Security and Counterintelligence.

This agency was succeeded by the National Security Agency

Directors

See also
North Macedonia
Intelligence Agency  (Civilian Agency)
  Military Service for Security and Intelligence-G2 (Military Agency)

References

External links 
 
 dbki.gov.mk Retrieved 15.05.2015 (Macedonian) 
slobodenpecat.mk 1/27/2015 Retrieved 18.05.2015 (Macedonian)

Specialist law enforcement agencies of North Macedonia
North Macedonia intelligence agencies
Domestic intelligence agencies